Saj‘ is a form of rhymed prose in Arabic literature. It is named so because of its evenness or monotony, or from a fancied resemblance between its rhythm and the cooing of a dove. It is a highly artificial style of prose, characterized by a kind of rhythm as well as rhyme. Saj‘ is used in sacred literature, including parts of the Quran, and in secular literature, such as the One Thousand and One Nights.

Saj‘ is also used in Persian literature, in works such as Saadi's partly prose, partly verse, book the Golestān, written in 1258 CE.

Description
It is a species of diction to which the Arabic language  peculiarly lends itself, because of its structure, the mathematical precision of its manifold formations and the essential assonance of numerous derivatives from the same root supplying the connection between the sound and signification of words.

A History of Muslim Philosophy, Book 5 says:
This common literary medium which developed out of the North Arabic, coinciding with the steady decline of the economic, political and cultural influence of the South, was leavened mainly in Hirah with the accompaniments of material and religious civilization as augmented with currents - Judaic, Christian, and Graeco-Roman - from the opposite end of the Northern Desert. Generally speaking, it was precise to finesse so far as Bedouin life and environment were concerned, but lacked the facility for conveying abstract ideas and general concepts. However, it possessed, by the very nature of its being a compromise between various dialects, an immense wealth of synonyms together with ample resources of rhyme and assonance inherent in its schematic morphology. Thus saj' (rhyme) came to be the first and natural form of artistic composition prompted by the instinct for symmetry and balance in the structure of short, compact sentences specially designed for intonation and oral transmission without being committed to writing. The saj' existed before meter; the evolution of metrical forms only pushed it to the end of a verse under the name of qafiyah.

According to Al-Jahiz, the advantages of rhymed prose are twofold; it is pleasing to the ear and easy to remember. He says the Arabs have uttered a far greater quantity of simple than of rhymed prose, and yet not a tenth of the former has been retained while not a tenth of the latter has been lost.

In pagan (pre-Islamic) times it is supposed to have been the mode of expression in dignified discourses, challenges, harangues and orations. It was also the form in which the oracular sayings and decisions of the kahana, the soothsayers or diviners, each of whom was supposed to have a familiar spirit, were expressed.

Because of its association with these pagan practices its use 'in commands and prohibitions' in the early days of Islam is said to have been forbidden. Muhammad said, "Avoid the rhyming prose of the soothsayers or diviners."

On the authority of Ahmad ibn Hanbal, the founder of one of the four Sunni schools of Islamic jurisprudence, we have it that Muhammad had an alleged repugnance to this kind of composition. In an incident related by him Muhammad said, "What! rhymed prose after the manner of the Arabs of the Days of the Ignorance?"

There is, therefore, naturally, no trace of it in the sermon of Muhammad after the capture of Mecca, nor is it to be found in his farewell address and final charge on the occasion of the last pilgrimage.  Nor is it used by the Khalifa Muawiyah in his last khutba.

In spite of the ban, however, it appears there were orators who spoke in rhymed prose.

With the spread of Islam the reason for the prohibition disappears and rhymed prose reasserts itself in some of the speeches made by Muslim orators in the presence of the first Khalifas and no objection appears to have been raised.

In early Islamic times it seems to belong to repartee, sententious sayings, the epigram, solemn utterances such as paternal advice,  religious formulae, prayers, elogia addressed to princes and governors. Al-Jahiz cites several specimens of these  and the author of the Kitab al-Aghani quotes a eulogy in rhymed prose  by Al-Nabigha, one of the most celebrated of the poets contemporary with Muhammad.

During the first century of the Hijra it appears to have been regarded as the symbol of an elevated style peculiar to the orator.

In the earlier specimens of female eloquence compiled by Abu’l-Fadl Ahmad ibn Tahir (A.H. 204-80) there is, however, very little trace of this species of composition. In fact it was regarded as a rare accomplishment if not a lost art. But a few sentences of this form of composition by the wife of Abú’l-Aswad al-Du‘lí sufficed to draw from the Khalafa Muawiyah the exclamation, 'Good gracious! What rhymed prose the woman speaks!'

The institution of the weekly address (khutba) by the Khalifa, led no doubt to careful preparation and thus paved the way for pulpit oratory which found its loftiest expression in rhymed prose. It is not, however, until the beginning of the third century of the Hijra that it reappears in the khutba and becomes the conventional style of the professional preacher. An excellent specimen of a khutba in rhymed prose on death, resurrection and judgement is that by Ibn Nubata (A.H. 335-74) entitled 'The Sermon of the Vision.'  The language is dignified and solemn, but perfectly plain and intelligible. A vast empire with its numerous provincial governments and political and commercial relations with neighbouring states required that its edicts, foreign despatches, and official correspondence should be expressed in language at once dignified and forceful.

Out of the necessity of this situation arose the study of the epistolary art and towards the beginning of the second century of the Hijra official letter writers had developed that florid style which has ever since been the distinguishing feature of such compositions. Nevertheless, there were writers who eschewed this ornateness and wrote in language easy to be understood.

A notable example of this natural and simple style is Al-Jahiz whose diction Hamadhani, writing a century later, condemns as wanting in artifice, adornment, and ornateness.

With such assiduity was the art of official writing cultivated, so great was the importance attached to it and so highly did it come to be appreciated, that the Katib, or secretary, not infrequently rose to the highest position in the state, that of Wazir, or chief minister. Tha‘alibi throws considerable light upon the rise and development of this official correspondence. He says that epistolary writing began with ‘Abd al-Hamid (ob. A.H. 133) Katib to Marwan II the last of the Omayyad Khalífas, and ended with Ibn al-Amid (ob. A.H. 359 or 360), the Wazir of Rukn al-Daula, the Buwayhid prince.

In this striving after an ornate and elevated style the adoption of a species of composition, that had raised pulpit oratory above the language of everyday life, seems to be a natural result, and thus rhymed prose became the essential feature not only of official writing, but also of the private correspondence of the learned and the cultured.

It will be sufficient to mention three collections of such Epistles: those of Abu’l ‘Ala al-Mu‘arri (A.H. 363-449), edited and translated into English by Professor D. S. Margoliouth; extracts from those of Abu Bakr al-Khwarizmi cited by Tha'alibi;  and those of al-Hamadhani himself.

It was Hamadhani, however, a master of the epistolary art himself, who conceived the idea of demonstrating in a series of dramatic discourses, known to us as the Maqamat, how the use of this mode of composition might be extended to literature so as to include the entire range of the life and language of the Arabian people. He was, therefore, the popularizer of rhymed prose, in a class of compositions with which his name was first associated, and which have not only penetrated all Islamic literature as well as that of the Syrian Christians, and the Spanish Jews, but have served as models of style for more than nine hundred years.

See also
Rhymed prose

References
The article is largely based on the introduction to the translation of Maqamat Badi' az-Zaman al-Hamadhani by William Joseph Prendergast, London,  (1915)  New impressions: Curzon Press (1973), RoutledgeCurzon (2004),

Further reading
al-Urfali, Reemah (2011). "Saj' Prose: Language of Rhyme and Tensions".

Arabic literature
Arabic and Central Asian poetics